Zuka Baloyi Stadium is a multi-use stadium in Welkom, Free State, South Africa.  It is currently used mostly for football matches and is the home ground of Dinonyana F.C and Harmony F.C.

Sports venues in the Free State (province)
Soccer venues in South Africa
Matjhabeng Local Municipality